The 1909–10 Maltese First Division was the first edition of the Maltese First Division, the precursor of today's Premier League.

Overview 

Following numerous attempts to organise a local football competition and the ever-increasing interest in the game, on 26 October 1907 the Lyceum Football ground was inaugurated in Marsa. This was to host the first football league campaign contested by Maltese teams and selections from the military service; the Royal Malta Artillery selection won the competition. This led to the set up of the first league season with all games to be played at the Lyceum Ground.

A total of five teams joined the league and the stipulation was that each team had to provide their own goalposts and nets. The league ended with a two-way tussle between Floriana and Sliema Wanderers, after the latter were awarded a 2–1 win over St. Joseph's United following crowd trouble. In the decider game played on 24 April 1910, Floriana triumphed with a single goal from top scorer Salvu Samuele thereby winning the first edition and being awarded the Daily Malta Chronicle Cup, a cup specifically designed for the occasion.

League table

Results

References

See also 
 1909 in association football
 1910 in association football

1909-10
1909–10 in European association football leagues
1909 in Malta
1910 in Malta